Phil's BBQ is a barbeque restaurant that was founded by Phil Pace. Their first location opened in 1998 in the Mission Hills neighborhood of San Diego, California. They have since expanded and now have four restaurant locations, with additional outlets in San Diego International Airport and Petco Park. The restaurants have received positive reception both in terms of their reviews as well as their success. It was featured on the shows Adam Richman's Best Sandwich in America and Man v. Food. Phil's BBQ was the second most commonly reviewed business in the United States on Yelp for 2013.

History 

Phil's BBQ was first opened in 1998 in the Mission Hills in San Diego, California by owner Phil Pace. In 2007, it opened a location in Point Loma. Another location was later opened in 2010 in San Marcos, California. In 2012, Phil leased approximately 7,000 square feet of land for a new location in Santee, California. The restaurant first opened on October 30, 2012 at the Old Trolley Square. In 2012 and 2013 respectively, Phil's BBQ restaurants were opened in both the Petco Park and the San Diego International Airport. In December 2013, it was announced that the Point Loma location would be temporarily closing in order to conduct $1 million worth of renovations. This was in order to implement energy-efficient equipment and systems as well as other improvements. It reopened six weeks later in February 2014. In March 2014, a second Petco Park location was announced to be in the works. The restaurant remodeled its bar area in October 2014.  Later, in 2016, Phil's BBQ opened its location in Rancho Bernardo. The company is aiming to open its first location outside of San Diego County in the Spring of 2020 in Temecula, California. 

Every year, Phil's BBQ hosts an event called "Phil's BBQ at the Ballpark." This event donates 100% of its ticket sales to Operation Bigs, a mentoring program made for military children. In 2018, Phil’s Big BBQ at the Ballpark raised a record-breaking $110,000 with 2,700 attendees.

Recognition and success 

Brandon Hernández of the San Diego Reader commented that Phil's BBQ was synonymous with San Diego, adding that it was as synonymous as "AleSmith, Ballast Point, and Karl Strauss". In an article for the San Diego Reader, editor Ian Pike noted that "any survey of San Diego’s barbecue scene would be woefully incomplete without considering [Phil's BBQ]." Phil's BBQ participated in a Travel Channel television show called Adam Richman's Best Sandwich in America, where it won the title of best sandwich on the West Coast. Richman called one of Phil's BBQ sandwiches - a tri-tip sandwich called the "El Toro" - "...without question one of the best sandwiches in America". It was also featured on an earlier show by Richman called Man v. Food, which vice president Fred Glick claimed doubled sales of the El Toro sandwich. Frank Sabatini, Jr., writing for the San Diego Gay & Lesbian News website, reviewed the restaurant. He rated its price as "moderate to high moderate", and gave it a "delightful" score of three out of four, and specifically cited the El Toro sandwich as a standout of the restaurant. Epicurious blogger Kerry Acker listed cited the Petco Park location as an example of quality ballpark food. The website Foursquare ranked Phil's BBQ among the top 10 most popular barbeque restaurants. Ellis Pierce, writing for the magazine "Cowboys & Indians", cited it as one of the "great barbeque joints of the west." In the Fodor's Southern California 2015 magazine, Phil's BBQ was listed as a "Fodor's Choice" and specifically cited the El Toro sandwich and its celebrity.

As of January 2014, Phil's BBQ was the second most commonly reviewed business on the user-based review website Yelp in the United States for 2013. It is the only San Diego-based restaurant to make Yelp's top 10 most-reviewed list. In July 2008, an article in San Diego Magazine had an announcement from Phil's BBQ that in its first 10 years, it has produced approximately 1 million pints of barbeque sauce.

See also
 List of barbecue restaurants

References

External links 
 Phil's BBQ official page

Restaurants in San Diego County, California
Barbecue restaurants in the United States